The Verlaines are a New Zealand rock band from Dunedin. Formed in 1981 by Graeme Downes, Craig Easton, Anita Pillai, Phillip Higham and Greg Kerr, the band went through multiple line-ups.

History
The band was named after French poet Paul Verlaine—not, as is occasionally suggested, Tom Verlaine, who also took his stage name from the poet. "I had just been reading some of his poetry," Downes told Paul A. Harris in 1993, "and threw the name at the head of the row, and we thought it sounded cool." Their recorded debut was on the seminal Dunedin Double EP, which was released by Flying Nun Records and was the debut of several bands who would go on to be central to the mythology of the Dunedin sound.

The Verlaines are noted for their angular, "difficult" song structures, wordy and downbeat lyrics, unusual subject matter, all contained in often frantic up-tempo playing. The Verlaines are led by songwriter and vocalist/guitarist Graeme Downes, although many other New Zealand musicians played guitar, bass, drums and brass instruments during the different stages of the band. Downes was an academic at the University of Otago, where he had previously been the head of the Department of Music, until 2020 when he retired after a cancer diagnosis. He taught contemporary music and has research interests in Mahler and Shostakovich. He has released one solo album, Hammers and Anvils, which came out on Matador Records in 2001.

The group's signature songs include "Death and the Maiden", "C.D. Jimmy Jazz & Me", "Bird-dog" and "Ballad of Harry Noryb."

In 2003, a career retrospective, You're Just Too Obscure for Me, was released.

The Verlaines contributed the soundtrack to the film Eden, collaborating with actor Adetokunbo Adu, and screenwriter Rebecca Tansley. A song from Eden, What Sound is This? appeared on their album Untimely Meditations in 2012.

The band's latest studio album, Dunedin Spleen, was released exclusively via digital download in 2019.  One year later, having been picked up by Schoolkids Records, an independent label out of North Carolina, it was released as a limited edition white vinyl, gatefold 2xLP on 24 October 2020 to coincide with Record Store Day.  There were only 700 copies made available worldwide.  On 4 June 2021, the album made its debut on compact disc for further consumption.

Discography

Featured appearances 
The group have appeared on several compilations over the years in New Zealand and overseas.

 (1987) – Tuatara: A Flying Nun Compilation (Flying Nun Records) – "Death and the Maiden"
 (1988) – In Love With These Times (Flying Nun) – "Slow Sad Love Song"
 (1991) – Getting Older 1981-1991 (Flying Nun) – "Pyromaniac"
 (1991) – Pink Flying Saucers Over The Southern Alps (Flying Nun) – "The Funniest Thing"
 (1993) – No Alternative (Arista) – "Heavy 33", "Joed Out" (performed by Barbara Manning)
 (1995) – Red Hot + Bothered (Red Hot Organization) – "Some Fantasy" (with Shayne Carter)
 (1999) – Scarfies OST (Flying Nun) – "Death and the Maiden"

Singles

Notes

External links 
 The Verlaines Myspace page
 Official The Verlaines Flying Nun artist page
 Flying Nun's liner notes for You're Just Too Obscure for Me
 Downes' University home page
 Verlaines music videos
 Untimely Meditations album

New Zealand indie rock groups
Flying Nun Records artists
Homestead Records artists
Dunedin Sound musical groups